Liselotte Maria "Lotta" Neumann (born 20 May 1966) is a Swedish professional golfer. When she recorded her first LPGA Tour win, by claiming the 1988 U.S. Women's Open title, Neumann also became the first Swedish golfer, male or female, to win a major championship.

Early years
Neumann was born and grew up in Finspång, Sweden. Her father Rune was a former football player and coach of a local girls football team. After practicing different sports and supported by her father, her mother Ingegerd and her brother Mats, Neumann began playing golf at the local 9-hole course at Finspång Golf Club. She showed early promise and won the unofficial national youth championships, Colgate Cup, at three different levels, as a 12, 14, and 16-year-old. Neumann has later given a lot of credit, for her successful career, to her local coach since her early years, Pierre Karlström. Neumann also has showed her loyalty to her first golf club by, three times during the peak of her career in the 1990s, inviting some of the female golf stars of the world, Laura Davies, Karrie Webb, Kelly Robbins and Jane Geddes among others, for exhibition matches in Finspång.

Amateur career
In 1981, only 15 years of age, she sensationally won the Swedish International Amateur Stroke-Play Championship, one of three major amateur tournaments in Sweden at the time, at Jönköping Golf Club, with a record aggregate of 282 and a 9-stroke margin. She bettered her personal 72-hole best with 30 strokes and beat the whole Swedish amateur national team, of which some did not even had heard of Neumann before the tournament. At the time of her triumph, she wasn't even qualified for the Swedish national junior team, which, the same summer, won the European Lady Junior's Team Championship.

The year after, she successfully defended her stroke-play title and, at 16 years old, was a member of the national team at the Espirito Santo Trophy in Geneva, Switzerland. In 1983, she finished second in Orange Bowl International Junior Championship in Coral Gables, Florida. In 1984, she was the Swedish Match Play champion (tournament for first time open for professionals), member of the winning Swedish team at the European Lady Junior's Team Championship at Campo de Golf El Saler, Valencia, Spain, and medalist at the 36-hole qualifying competition in the European Ladies Team Championship, in Waterloo, Belgium. After another appearance at the Espirito Santo Trophy in Hong Kong in late 1984, she turned professional at the beginning of 1985, not yet 19 years old.

Professional career
She collected her first professional win at the Pierre Robert Cup, over 54 holes at Falsterbo Golf Club, in Sweden in May 1985 and played on the Ladies European Tour (at the time named the WPGA Tour) the second half of the year, were she won twice. At the Höganäs Ladies Open at Mölle Golf Club in Sweden, she became the youngest ever winner on the WPGA Tour.

She led the 1986 Ladies European Tour Order of Merit for most of the season, with eight straight top three finishes, but lost the lead to Laura Davies at the last tournament, the Spanish Open. While Davies won the tournament, Neumann finished 27th, her worst of the season. In the rankings, Neumann finished second, earning £494 less than Davies. The same year the ladies' Swedish Golf Tour get started with seven tournaments and Neumann was its first Order of Merit winner.

Neumann became a member of the LPGA Tour in 1988, after tying fourth at the LPGA Tour Final Qualifying Tournament in late 1987.

At the 1988 U.S. Women's Open at Baltimore Country Club, Five Farms, Baltimore, Maryland, July 21-24, at 22 years of age, Neumann led wire-to-wire in just her 16th LPGA Tour tournament, setting a new tournament first-round record 67 and 72-hole record 277, becoming the first Swedish major winner, male or female, as well as the first Swedish tournament winner on the LPGA Tour or the PGA Tour. She became the fifth non-U.S.-winner and the second youngest (by two months to Catherine Lacoste in 1967) in the 43-year history of the championship. She was voted 1988 LPGA Tour Rookie of the Year and earned her second Swedish Golfer of the Year award. She was also appointed 1988 Swedish Sportswomen of the Year by Aftonbladet and the Swedish Sports Confederation.

In total she won thirteen times on the LPGA Tour. The 1988 U.S. Women's Open remains her only LPGA major, but she won the Women's British Open in 1994, when it was recognised as a major championship by the Ladies European Tour, but not by the LPGA Tour. She also finished second five times in three other major championships.

Her best finish on the LPGA Tour money list is third in 1994. She also finished top ten in 1996, 1997 and 1998.

Throughout her career on the LPGA Tour, she continued to play on the Ladies European Tour, as well as in Asia and Australia. She won five times in Japan and the 1995 Women's Australian Open. Her victory in the 1994 Women’s British Open made her the fifth player to win both British and U.S. Open titles, joining Laura Davies, Jane Geddes, Betsy King and Patty Sheehan. This accomplishment was later also achieved by Alison Nicholas, Pak Se-ri, Karrie Webb, Inbee Park and Ariya Jutanugarn. In 1994 Neumann topped the LET Order of Merit, was voted Golf Worlds Most Improved Golfer and awarded Swedish Golfer of the Year for the third time.

Neumann played in the European Solheim Cup team against United States, six times in a row, 1990, 1992, 1994, 1996, 1998, and 2000. She captained the team to victory in August, 2013 at Colorado Golf Club in Parker, Colorado, the first time team Europe won the cup on foreign soil, and the first time Europe won consecutive cups. Neumann won the Women's World Cup of Golf for Sweden in 2006 with Annika Sörenstam.

Awards and honors
Besides being awarded Swedish Golfer of the Year three times, Neumann received the Golden Club by the Swedish Golf Federation in 1998, as the tenth person, for great contributions to Swedish golf.

In 1998, she also became an honorary member of the PGA of Sweden.

She was recognized during the LPGA’s 50th Anniversary in 2000 as one of the LPGA’s top 50 players and teachers.

On June 7, 2006, the Ladies European Tour announced that Neumann has earned Lifetime Membership of the LET, at the time a feat achieved by six other golfers, Helen Alfredsson, Laura Davies, Marie-Laure de Lorenzi, Alison Nicholas, Dale Reid and Annika Sorenstam.

Amateur wins
1981 Swedish International Stroke-play Championship
1982 Swedish Junior Stroke-play Championship, Swedish International Stroke-play Championship, Scandinavian Foursome (with Signe Lindfeldt), Dunlop Open (Täby GC)

Professional wins (36)
LPGA Tour wins (13)LPGA Tour playoff record (2–2)Major championships is shown in bold.Ladies European Tour wins (11)Ladies European Tour playoff record (1–1)Note: Neumann won the Women's British Open once after it was co-sanctioned by the LPGA Tour in 1994, but before it was recognized as a major championship on the LPGA Tour in 2001.
LPGA of Japan Tour wins (5)LPGA of Japan Tour playoff record (1–1) ALPG Tour wins (1) ALPG Tour playoff record (1–0)Other wins (5)
1984 (1) Swedish Match-play Championship (as an amateur)
1985 (1) Pierre Robert Cup (Sweden)
1987 (1) Singapore Open (Asian Tour)
1992 (1) Sunrise Cup World Team Championship (team with Helen Alfredsson) (individual, shared with Trish Johnson, England)
2006 (1) Women's World Cup of Golf (team event with Annika Sörenstam; recognised by all the main women's tours, but not an official money event)
1Co-sanctioned by the LPGA Tour and the Japan LPGA Tour2Co-sanctioned by the LPGA Tour and the Ladies European Tour

Legends Tour wins (4)

Major championships
Wins (1)

Results timeline

^ The Women's British Open replaced the du Maurier Classic as an LPGA major in 2001.

CUT = missed the half-way cut.
WD = withdrew
"T" tied.

Summary
Starts – 85
Wins – 1
2nd-place finishes – 5
3rd-place finishes – 4
Top 3 finishes – 10
Top 5 finishes – 13
Top 10 finishes – 17
Top 25 finishes – 34
Missed cuts – 21
Most consecutive cuts made – 14
Longest streak of top-10s – 3

LPGA Tour career summary

Team appearancesAmateurEuropean Lady Junior's Team Championship (representing Sweden): 1982, 1983, 1984 (winners)
Espirito Santo Trophy (representing Sweden): 1982, 1984
European Ladies' Team Championship (representing Sweden): 1983
Vagliano Trophy (representing Continent of Europe): 1983Professional'
Solheim Cup (representing Europe): 1990, 1992 (winners), 1994, 1996, 1998, 2000 (winners), 2013 (winners, non-playing captain)
World Cup (representing Sweden): 2006 (winners)
Handa Cup (representing World team): 2011, 2013 (winners), 2014, 2015

Solheim Cup record

See also
List of golfers with most Ladies European Tour wins
List of golfers with most LPGA Tour wins

References

External links

Swedish female golfers
LPGA Tour golfers
Ladies European Tour golfers
Winners of LPGA major golf championships
Solheim Cup competitors for Europe
Sportspeople from Östergötland County
People from Finspång Municipality
People from Rancho Mirage, California
1966 births
Living people